The Lew M. Meder House, at 308 N. Nevada St. in Carson City, Nevada, United States, is a historic house with Late Victorian architecture that was built in 1876.  It was listed on the National Register of Historic Places in 1978.

Measured drawings of the house were prepared by the Historic American Buildings Survey.  Its NRHP nomination suggests that its NRHP recognition would support designation of a surrounding area as a historic district.

References

External links

Historic American Buildings Survey in Nevada
Houses completed in 1876
Houses on the National Register of Historic Places in Nevada
National Register of Historic Places in Carson City, Nevada
Victorian architecture in Nevada
Houses in Carson City, Nevada